Events from the year 1607 in art.

Events
Work by the German painter Peter Reimers first appears in Kinsarvik, effectively beginning the Stavanger renaissance.

Paintings

 Caravaggio
Saint Jerome Writing
The Flagellation of Christ
The Crucifixion of Saint Andrew
The Seven Works of Mercy
David with the Head of Goliath (Kunsthistorisches Museum, Vienna)
Madonna of the Rosary
The Crowning with Thorns
Christ at the Column
Salome with the Head of John the Baptist (National Gallery, London)
 Cigoli - The Sacrifice of Isaac (approximate date)
 Ambrosius Francken - triptych of the Crucifixion (formerly at main altar of Church of the Augustinians in Mechelen)
 Peter Paul Rubens - Susanna and the Elders

Births
May 31 - Johann Wilhelm Baur, German engraver, etcher and miniature painter (died 1640)
July 12 - Jean Petitot, French-Swiss enamel painter (died 1691)
July 13 - Wenceslaus Hollar, Bohemian etcher (died 1677)
October 24 – Jan Lievens (died 1674), Dutch painter and visual artist
 specific date not listed
Hendrick Andriessen, Flemish still-life painter (died 1655)
Bartholomeus Assteyn, Dutch painter (died 1669/1677)
Francesco Cairo, Italian painter active in Lombardy and Piedmont (died 1665)
Vincenzo Dandini, Italian painter active in Florence (died 1675)
Frans Francken III, Flemish painter (died 1667)
Mathieu Le Nain ("le Chevalier") (died 1677) of the Le Nain brothers, French Baroque painter
Alfonso Rivarola, Italian painter, active mainly in his native Ferrara (died 1640)
Cornelis Saftleven, Dutch painter (died 1681)
Gerard van Zyl, Dutch Golden Age painter of portraits and genre scenes (died 1665)

Deaths
January - Gillis van Coninxloo, Dutch painter of forest landscapes (born 1544)
March - Étienne Dupérac, French painter, draughtsman and engraver, topographer and antiquarian (born 1520)
April 6 - Jan Saenredam, Dutch engraver (born 1565)
May 10 - Pieter Schoubroeck, German landscape painter (born c.1570)
July 24 - Alessandro Pieroni, Italian mannerist painter and architect (born 1550)
September 22 - Alessandro Allori, Italian portrait painter of the late Mannerist Florentine school (born 1535)
date unknown - Cornelius Cure, English-born sculptor of Dutch parentage
probable - Barthel Bruyn the Younger, German portraitist, son of Barthel Bruyn the Elder (born 1530)

 
Years of the 17th century in art
1600s in art